Melitta Rene Schmideberg-Klein (née Klein; 17 January 1904 – 10 February 1983) was a Slovakian-born British-American physician, psychiatrist, and psychoanalyst.

Biography

Schmideberg was born in Ružomberok, Austria-Hungary (now Slovakia) into a Jewish family, the only daughter and eldest child of Arthur Klein and psychoanalyst Melanie Klein (née Reizes). Prior to the First World War, the family moved to Budapest. Following the war, her father moved to Sweden and Melitta and her mother returned to Ružomberok, where Melitta graduated from high school in 1921. She moved to Berlin to train at the Berlin Psychoanalytic Institute, where she met Austrian psychoanalyst Walter Schmideberg, a friend of Freud, whom she married in 1924.

In 1927, Schmideberg earned her M.D. from Friedrich-Wilhelms-Universität in Berlin. That same year, her mother moved to London. Five years later, in response to rising anti-Semitism in Germany, Melitta and her husband joined her in London, where she became a British citizen.

She moved to New York City in 1945 and helped found the Association for the Psychiatric Treatment of Offenders in New York. She became a U.S. citizen in 1959, when she was living at 444 Central Park West.

After her mother's death in 1960, she returned to London, where she died in 1983.

Career
In London, she joined the British Psychoanalytical Society as associate member.  Entering further analysis with Edward Glover, she became a partisan with him in their vocal dispute with her own mother; and later resigned from the Society in 1944 to concentrate on her work with juvenile delinquency. She is sometimes seen as an extreme example of the bitterness that can be instilled by having an analytic parent.

She was the founding editor of the International Journal of Offender Therapy and Comparative Criminology.

Publications

Early articles
In the 1930s, Schmideberg published a series of articles in the International Journal of Psychoanalysis, on subjects ranging from the asocial child to intellectual inhibitions.

Blitz studies
During The Blitz, Schmideberg published a set of observations on reactions to the air-raids in London, noting increases in localism, in drinking and (especially in women) sexual desire.

Books

 with Gerhard O. W. Mueller, Irving Barnett.

See also
Barbara Low
Controversial discussions
Kate Friedlander

References

External links
Melitta Schmideberg

1904 births
1983 deaths
British Jews
People from Ružomberok
British psychoanalysts
American psychoanalysts
20th-century British medical doctors
American physicians
Hungarian emigrants to England
Slovak emigrants to the United Kingdom
Naturalised citizens of the United Kingdom
People with acquired American citizenship
British emigrants to the United States
Hungarian emigrants to the United States
Slovak emigrants to the United States
Hungarian Jews
Slovak Jews
Jewish emigrants from Nazi Germany to the United Kingdom